Attica Township may refer to the following townships in the United States:

 Attica Township, Sedgwick County, Kansas
 Attica Township, Michigan